NGA may refer to:

 Natural Gas Act
 BBC Radio 3 New Generation Artists scheme, a talent scheme run by BBC Radio 3
 Next generation access, fibre optic broadband
 National Gallery of Art in the US
 National Gallery of Australia
 National Geospatial-Intelligence Agency, an intelligence agency of the United States
 National Golf Association in the US
 National Governors Association, a US-based organisation for State Governors
 National Governors' Association (UK charity), an English charity relating to school governors
 National Graphical Association, a British trade union
 National Greyhound Association in the US
 National Gym Association
 Nga (god), a Siberian deity
 Nga people, a tribal group of Arunachal Pradesh
 Ngā, the (plural) definite article in the Māori language
 Nigeria, by ISO 3166-1 three-letter (alpha-3) code
 Nga (Indic), a glyph in the Brahmic family of scripts
 Nga (Javanese) (ꦔ), a letter in the Javanese script
 Young Airport, IATA airport code "NGA"